Ryan Hinds (born June 19, 1986 in Georgetown, Guyana and raised in Toronto, Ontario) is a retired professional Canadian football defensive back. He played college football for the New Hampshire Wildcats. A Biology major, In the 31 games he played, Hinds made 60 tackles (40 solo), 5 interceptions (218 yards total return), and 20 pass break ups. Ryan Hinds sits on the Board of Directors for GTA Youth Athletics, a not-for-profit organization he began to teach children leadership through the sport of football.

Professional career

Hamilton Tiger-Cats 
He was drafted by the Hamilton Tiger-Cats in the 2009 CFL Draft with the 13th pick in the second round. After being with the team for four seasons, he was released by the Tiger-Cats on August 14, 2013.

Edmonton Eskimos 
Hinds signed with the Edmonton Eskimos about two weeks after being released by the Ti-Cats. Hinds played in 22 games for the Eskimos in three seasons. He was not re-signed by the club following the 2015 CFL season, and became a free-agent on February 9, 2016.

Ottawa RedBlacks 
On February 19, 2016, Hinds agreed to a contract with the Ottawa RedBlacks. However, Hinds elected not to attend training camp, announcing via his agent that, "his heart wasn’t in it and he wasn’t going to play anymore".

References

External links
Ottawa Redblacks bio 
Edmonton Eskimos bio
Hamilton Tiger-Cats bio
GTA Youth Athletics

1986 births
Living people
Sportspeople from Georgetown, Guyana
Canadian football defensive backs
Guyanese emigrants to Canada
Edmonton Elks players
Hamilton Tiger-Cats players
New Hampshire Wildcats football players
Ottawa Redblacks players
Players of Canadian football from Ontario
Canadian football people from Toronto